Aleksandra Krunić and Kateřina Siniaková were the defending champions, but chose not to participate together. Krunić played alongside Petra Martić, but lost in the quarterfinals to Anna-Lena Friedsam and Katarzyna Piter.
Siniaková teamed up with Vera Dushevina, but lost in the final to Margarita Gasparyan and Alexandra Panova, 1–6, 6–3, [3–10].

Seeds

Draw

Draw

References
Main Draw

Tashkent Open - Doubles
2015 Tashkent Open